Veronika Kudermetova was the defending champion, but she withdrew before the tournament began.

Belinda Bencic won the title, defeating Ons Jabeur in the final, 6–1, 5–7, 6–4. Bencic became the first Swiss player to win the title since Martina Hingis in 1999, and winning the title meant that she has won titles on all three major surfaces.

Seeds 
The top eight seeds received a bye into the second round.

Draw

Finals

Top half

Section 1

Section 2

Bottom half

Section 3

Section 4

Qualifying

Seeds

Qualifiers

Lucky losers

Qualifying draw

First qualifier

Second qualifier

Third qualifier

Fourth qualifier

Fifth qualifier

Sixth qualifier

Seventh qualifier

Eighth qualifier

References

External links
 Main draw
 Qualifying draw

Charleston Open - Singles
2022 Charleston Open - Singles